Valley of the Sun is a 1942 American Western film directed by George Marshall and starring Lucille Ball and James Craig.

Cast
 Lucille Ball as Christine Larson
 James Craig as Jonathan Ware
 Cedric Hardwicke as Lord Warrick
 Dean Jagger as Jim Sawyer
 Peter Whitney as Willie
 Billy Gilbert as Judge Homer Burnaby
 Tom Tyler as Geronimo
 Antonio Moreno as Chief Cochise
 George Cleveland as Bill Yard
 Hank Bell as Hank - Shotgun Guard

References

External links
 
 
 
 

1942 films
Films directed by George Marshall
1942 Western (genre) films
American Western (genre) films
RKO Pictures films
American black-and-white films
Films scored by Paul Sawtell
1940s American films
1940s English-language films